Continued Silence EP is the fifth EP by American rock band Imagine Dragons, released on February 14, 2012 by KIDinaKORNER and Interscope Records. It was recorded at Westlake Recording Studios. All songs were written by Imagine Dragons and produced by Alex Da Kid, with mixing by engineer Manny Marroquin and engineer Rich Costey. The EP was mastered by mastering engineer Joe LaPorta. All of the songs on Continued Silence were featured on the band's debut album Night Visions except for "My Fault" and "Round and Round", which were later included on deluxe editions of Night Visions. Previous purchases of songs from the EP counted towards Night Visions and decreased its price.

Personnel
Imagine Dragons
Dan Reynolds – lead vocals
Daniel Wayne Sermon – guitars, backing vocals
Ben McKee – bass, backing vocals
Daniel Platzman – drums, backing vocals

Release and promotion
To promote the album, the band performed at SXSW 2012 and toured the United States with Australian group The Jezabels. Their more than fifteen SXSW performances included the broadcast mtvU Woodie Awards Festival as well as the FILTER party, Rachael Ray's party, and The Roxy's party. They also performed at Basilica Block Party, Summerfest, Bunbury Music Festival 2012, Live 105's BFD 2012 and Firefly Music Festival 2012. They also performed at Chicago's Riot Fest 2012. iTunes featured the EP on its "Rising Stars of Alt Rock" in addition to featuring track "It's Time" on its $0.69 "Alt Rock Hits" beginning April 30, 2012.

Singles
"It's Time" became the first single from the EP and began receiving airplay on February 20, 2012. The track "Radioactive" also both received airplay and charted on the Billboard Hot 100. The official music video for "It's Time" debuted on all MTV affiliates on April 17, 2012. Imagine Dragons were the MTV PUSH Artist of the Week of April 16, 2012.

The song "Round and Round" was featured as "Song of the Week" and thus a free download on iTunes.

Reception

Critical reception
Continued Silence was praised by music critics. Jason Bracelin of the Las Vegas Review-Journal and Spin wrote, "'Silence' builds on the Dragons' climactic, dance floor-worthy swagger, with supersized, arms-in-the-air choruses and a buoyant groove amplified by the introduction of sub-hip-hop beats". Cincinnati CityBeat wrote "A quick spin through Continued Silence...is like panning in a creek bedded with gold nuggets; glints of Coldplay, Everclear, Train and any number of other chart-topping Pop icons, but with a discernibly beat-driven Indie edge. As epic as Homerian poetry set to a U2 soundtrack and as intimate as a candlelight dinner in the Nevada desert."

Commercial performance
The EP reached number 40 on the Billboard 200 and number 1 on the Billboard Heatseekers Albums chart.

Track listing

Chart performance

Release history

References

External links

Continued Silence EP at YouTube (streamed copy where licensed)
 Imagine Dragons official site

2012 EPs
Imagine Dragons EPs
Albums produced by Alex da Kid
Interscope Records EPs
Kidinakorner albums